Mattias Jakob Nylund (born 23 September 1980) is a Swedish former footballer, who now works as head coach at Norwegian 4th division club Steinkjer.

Nylund was a left full back. He played in Trelleborgs FF from the start of 2008, after a transfer from Aalesunds FK. Due to injuries he never got established at Trelleborg and left on a free transfer after the season of 2009. In 2010, he returned to his old club GIF Sundsvall to regain fitness after having done rehab for a cruciate ligament injury. After a few months of training he signed a contract with GIF Sundsvall lasting the rest of the 2010 season.

He has played once for the Sweden national football team in 2005.

External links
 

1980 births
Living people
Swedish footballers
Sweden international footballers
Allsvenskan players
Eliteserien players
Trelleborgs FF players
GIF Sundsvall players
Aalesunds FK players
SV Ried players
AIK Fotboll players
Swedish expatriate footballers
Expatriate footballers in Norway
Swedish expatriate sportspeople in Norway
Expatriate footballers in Austria
Association football defenders
People from Sundsvall
Sportspeople from Västernorrland County